A rocket sled is a test platform that slides along a set of rails, propelled by rockets. 

As its name implies, a rocket sled does not use wheels.  Instead, it has sliding pads, called "slippers", which are curved around the head of the rails to prevent the sled from flying off the track.  The rail cross-section profile is that of a Vignoles rail, commonly used for railroads. Wheels cannot be used on rocket sleds as the high velocities experienced will result in the wheels spinning to pieces due to extreme centrifugal forces.

A rocket sled holds the land-based speed record for a vehicle, at Mach 8.5.

Usage

A rocket sled is reported to have been used in the closing days of World War II by the Germans to launch a winged A4b strategic rocket from a tunnel on March 16, 1945.
 
Rocket sleds were used extensively early in the Cold War to accelerate equipment considered too experimental (hazardous) for testing directly in piloted aircraft.  The equipment to be tested under high acceleration or high airspeed conditions was installed along with appropriate instrumentation, data recording and telemetry equipment on the sled. The sled was then accelerated according to the experiment's design requirements for data collection along a length of isolated, precisely level and straight test track.
Testing ejection seat systems and technology prior to their use in experimental or operational aircraft was a common application of the rocket sled at Holloman Air Force Base.  Perhaps the most famous, the tracks at Edwards Air Force Base were used to test missiles, supersonic ejection seats, aircraft shapes and the effects of acceleration and deceleration on humans. The rocket sled track at Edwards Air Force Base was dismantled and used to extend the track at Holloman Air Force Base, taking it to almost 10 miles (16 km) in length.

Unmanned rocket sleds continue to be used to test missile components without requiring costly live missile launches.  A world speed record of Mach 8.5 (6,416 mph / 10,325 km/h) was achieved by a four-stage rocket sled at Holloman Air Force Base on April 30, 2003, the highest speed ever attained by a land vehicle.

Murphy's law first received public attention during a press conference about rocket sled testing.

Examples

See also
 Land speed record for railed vehicles
 Land speed record
 List of vehicle speed records
 Rocket sled launch

References

External links

Holloman High Speed Test Track
Sandia Sled Tracks 
Redstone Technical Test Center Test Area 1
Langford Lodge Martin Baker Track
New Mexico Tech EMRTC Sled Track
Improbable Research
 Airmen "Crash" on Rocket Sled, March 1950, Popular Science large article

Rocketry